Arthur Hertzberg (June 9, 1921 – April 17, 2006) was a Conservative rabbi and prominent Jewish-American scholar and activist.

Biography
Avraham Hertzberg was born in Lubaczów, Poland, the eldest of five children, and left Europe in 1926 with his mother and grandmother to join his father in the United States, where his name was Americanized to Arthur. Hertzberg recalled that as a teenager in an Orthodox Jewish neighborhood in Baltimore, Maryland, he would not accept the notion that the literary world of talmudic learning, the kabbalistic books and the writing of the chasidim were less worthy as compared to the Iliad, the Odyssey or Dante's Inferno. His father was an Orthodox rabbi trained in Eastern Europe, who taught Arthur to appreciate the richness of the Talmud and the other great works of Judaism. Although Hertzberg would later stray from his Orthodox upbringing and be ordained as a Conservative rabbi, he "never used my 'heresy' as the excuse to prefer the majority culture to my own." Hertzberg was a student of Ernst Cassirer at Columbia University in the winter of 1944-1945. After Cassirer's death there, he conducted his funeral service as a young rabbi.
He was married to the former Phyllis Cannon from 1950 until his death. They are the parents of two daughters, Dr. Linda Beth and Susan Riva, and they have four grandchildren named Rachel, Mike, Michelle, and Derek.

Hertzberg's love of Judaism and the Jewish texts was at the core of his life as a rabbi, scholar, educator and Jewish communal leader. Over the course of his 50-plus year career, Rabbi Hertzberg served as a congregational rabbi, president of both the American Jewish Policy Foundation and the American Jewish Congress, vice president of the World Jewish Congress and a leading representative of world Jewry in the historic Catholic–Jewish dialogue that commenced during the papacy of Pope John XXIII. As a major public figure in the world of Jewish organizational life, Hertzberg was at the center of the crucial events shaping American Jewish life since the end of World War II.

A resident of Englewood, New Jersey, Hertzberg died on April 17, 2006, of heart failure en route to Pascack Valley Hospital in Westwood, New Jersey, at the age of 84. He was survived by his wife, daughters, brothers Rabbi Isaiah and Rabbi Joshua, and a sister, Eve Rosenfeld.

Social activism
He participated in the 1943 Rabbis' march, walked with Martin Luther King Jr. in both the 1963 March on Washington for Jobs and Freedom and the 1965 "Bloody Sunday", during the first of the Selma to Montgomery marches, at the height of the American civil rights movement. Hertzberg also served as an intermediary between the American Jewish community and Secretary of State Henry Kissinger. Hertzberg played a major role in some of the most significant issues the world Jewish community faced in the decades following World War II, including discussions with the Roman Catholic Church over the still unresolved conflict over the Vatican's release of documents pertaining to Pius XII and the Holocaust, as well as his outspoken criticism of the policies of Israel toward the Palestinians.

Views and influences
Mordecai Kaplan was also an influence on the young Hertzberg, who attended the Jewish Theological Seminary in New York City, where Kaplan taught and served as dean. Kaplan had proved, writes Hertzberg, that with talent and guts, you can be your own man even in mainstream America. Both from Kaplan and later from the eminent scholar of Jewish history, Salo W. Baron, Hertzberg accepted the hypothesis that cultural and religious identity in America would exist in the future "only if they were redefined and reconstructed." Because the two men shared a genuine respect both for tradition and for intellectual rigor, during Kaplan's lectures on Reconstructionist philosophy, Hertzberg was welcome to speak up, in that situation advocating more traditional views.

Kaplan's influence is apparent when considering the breadth of Hertzberg's public career and reputation as gadfly. Never one to eschew unpopular stands when it came to core issues that impacted on the Jewish community, Hertzberg's reputation as a maverick was perhaps most in evidence in the aftermath of the Six-Day War in 1967 when he called for the creation of a Palestinian state alongside Israel, a position that was anathema among most American Jews. He had recounted his public battles with both Golda Meir and Menachem Begin over their policies toward the Palestinians:
I was largely in opposition to the dominant policies. I found myself restating this view year by year, as repeated attempts were made to silence me in Jerusalem and by its lackeys in New York and Washington. I insisted that we in the Diaspora could represent the best interest of the Jews worldwide—never mind the political and moral foolishness that governments in power might be proclaiming … I also had no fear that I was committing treason by denouncing what I knew was wrong and foolish, and I laughed off the label "maverick".

Hertzberg's early support for accommodation with the Palestinians, coming from a leader of the American Jewish establishment, subsequently added credibility to the Israeli peace movement.

Hertzberg challenged the wisdom of what he viewed as banking the future of Jewish continuity on the twin pillars of unquestioned support for Israel and the veneration of the Holocaust. Referring to the United States Holocaust Memorial Museum in Washington, D.C., as "the national cathedral of American Jewry's Jewishness", Hertzberg questioned whether the memory of the Holocaust was sufficient to keep Jews "on the reservation." Citing demographic studies, he contended that the proliferation of courses on the Holocaust would not be sufficient to stop a large number of Jews from leaving the Jewish community.

Academic career
Hertzberg graduated from Johns Hopkins University in 1940, received rabbinic ordination from the Jewish Theological Seminary of America in 1943 and a Ph.D. in history from Columbia University in 1966. He began his career as the director of the campus Hillel for Amherst College and the University of Massachusetts Amherst, and taught at Princeton, Rutgers, Columbia, Hebrew University, and Dartmouth. He was the Bronfman Visiting Professor of the Humanities at New York University from 1991 until his death in 2006.

Rabbinic career
In addition to his academic posts, Hertzberg was a rabbi for congregations in Philadelphia and Nashville, served as a chaplain in the United States Air Force from 1951 to 1953. He lived in Englewood, New Jersey, where he served as rabbi of Temple Emanu-El from 1956 to 1985, and remained as rabbi emeritus until his death. He also served as president of the American Jewish Policy Foundation since 1978, president of the American Jewish Congress from 1972 to '78, and vice president of the World Jewish Congress from 1975 to 1991.

Meeting with John Paul II
During Pope John Paul's March 2000 Jerusalem visit, he asked the Pope numerous questions about his activities during the Second World War.

Jewish scholarship
Hertzberg also made his mark in Jewish scholarship. His landmark book, The French Enlightenment and the Jews: The Origins of Modern Anti-Semitism (1968), argued that the source of modern antisemitism could be traced to the ideas of such Age of Enlightenment philosophers as Voltaire. Similarly, his The Zionist Idea: A Historical Analysis and Reader (1970) pioneered the study of Zionism and provided generations of students with the understanding that modern Zionism was a secular movement to remake Jewish identity into one of the many modern secular nationalisms. Finally, although a self-styled pragmatic liberal, Hertzberg saw no contradiction between his political convictions and his reverence for a Jewish tradition shorn of its religious fundamentalism.

Hertzberg wrote, edited or co-edited over thirteen books. Hertzberg had planned to write two more books and had partially completed one at the time of his death, entitled This I Believe, an exploration of his personal theology. He had also intended to write a book explicating the Talmud to an educated but non-Orthodox Jewish audience, preserving the integrity of the source material but also demonstrating its relevance and accessibility to modern readers.

In his memoir A Jew in America, Hertzberg frequently referred to American poet Ralph Waldo Emerson. Emerson, a descendant of American Puritans who revolted against his heritage and became a Unitarian, wrote that "every man is a conveyance on which all his ancestors ride." Hertzberg said he may not have opted to agree with every word of his Jewish forebears but wrote "my respect and reverence for them is the foundation of my being."

Published works
 Essays on Jewish Life and Thought (1959) (co-editor)
 The Zionist Idea (1959)
 The Outbursts That Await Us (1963)
 The French Enlightenment and the Jews (1968) – won the first Amran Award as the best work of nonfiction in the Jewish field.
 Judaism (1961)
 Being Jewish in America (1978)
 The Jews in America: Four Centuries of an Uneasy Encounter (1989), 
 Jewish Polemics (1992)
 At Home Only with God (1993)
 The Zionist Idea (1997)
 Jews: The Essence and Character of a People (1998) (co-authored with Aron Hirt-Manheimer)
 A Jew in America: My Life And a People's Struggle for Identity (2002)
 The Fate of Zionism : A Secular Future for Israel & Palestine (2003).

References

External links

 Articles by Arthur Hertzberg on the Berman Jewish Policy Archive @ NYU Wagner
 New York Times Obituary, April 18, 2006
 Jewish Standard Obituary, April 21, 2006
 Association for Jewish Studies Obituary focusing on his work in Jewish education, Fall 2006.
 Amazon's Listing
 American Jewish Congress
 Arthur on 9-11
 Beliefnet Entry
 New Age Zionism: Holding On as the World Turns Arthur Hertzberg. January 1, 1998
 New York Review of Books entry
 The Day the Rabbi Rescued Rashid by Martin Kramer
 
  by Leon Charney on The Leon Charney Report
  by Leon Charney on The Leon Charney Report

1921 births
2006 deaths
Jews from Galicia (Eastern Europe)
Dartmouth College faculty
American Conservative rabbis
Polish emigrants to the United States
American Jewish Congress
Writers on Zionism
Jewish historians
Historians of Jews and Judaism
Columbia University faculty
Columbia University alumni
Johns Hopkins University alumni
Jewish Theological Seminary of America semikhah recipients
Baltimore City College alumni
American Jewish theologians
Writers from Baltimore
People from Englewood, New Jersey
American social activists
20th-century American rabbis
21st-century American Jews